Elba Perla Fuscaldo (born 1941) is an Argentinian Egyptologist, specialist in the ceramics of  Ancient Egypt.

Life

She graduated in 1967 in history from the University of Buenos Aires and obtained her PhD in 1978 under the supervision of Argentinian egyptologist Abraham Rosenvasser.

She was professor in the University of Buenos Aires, director of the Institute of Oriental Ancient History (IHAO-UBA), director of the Program of Studies in Egyptology (PREDE-CONICET), head of the department of Egyptology (IMHICIHU-CONICET, today Unit of Investigations on the Ancient Near East) and honorary researcher at the Museum of Natural Sciences of La Plata.

She was director of the Revista del Instituto de Historia Antigua Oriental (RIHAO, Journal of the Institute of Ancient East History ) and the monograph series Annexes to the Magazine of Studies in Egiptology (Revista de Estudios de Egiptología – REE). She is honorary researcher at the Centre of Studies History of the Ancient Orient(Pontifical Catholic University of Argentina).

She was director of the Argentinian Archaeologic Mission in Tell the-Ghaba, Sinai Peninsula, on the Way of Horus. She participated in the Austrian archaeological mission in Tell the-Dab'to, ancient Avaris, the capital of the Hyksos period, under the supervision of Manfred Bietak.

Publications 
 Tell el-Dab`to X: The Palace District of Avaris. The Pottery of the Hyksos Period and the New Kingdom (Areas H/III and H/SAW). Part I: Locus 66. (Denkschriften  der  Gesamtakademie. Untersuchungen  der  Zweigstelle  Kairo Give  österreichischen  archäologischen Institutes, herausgegeben in Verbindung mit der ägyptischen Kommission von Manfred Bietak, Band XVI).  Austrian Academy of Sciences Press, Vienna, 2000.
 
Tell el-Dab`to X: The Palace District of Avaris. The Pottery of the Hyksos Period and the New Kingdom (Areas H/III and H/VI). Part II: Two Execration Pits and a Foundation Deposit, Austrian Academy of Sciences Press, Vienna, 2010.

References

External links 
 Official page of P. Fuscaldo, CEHAO
 "Preparing a unique Egyptian exhibition", La Nation 2009

1941 births
Living people
Argentine archaeologists
Argentine women archaeologists
20th-century women scientists
21st-century women scientists
Academic staff of the University of Buenos Aires
Argentine Egyptologists
Argentine women historians
20th-century Argentine historians
20th-century Argentine women writers
21st-century Argentine women writers
21st-century Argentine historians